Voŭpa (Volpa), also known as Volpe, Wolpe, Wolp, or Woupa, is a town in the Vawkavysk District of Grodno Region, in Western Belarus.

Voupa was noted for the Wolpa Synagogue,  reputed to be the "most beautiful" of the wooden synagogues of the former Polish–Lithuanian Commonwealth, a "masterwork" of wooden architecture.

External links
 http://www.belarusguide.com/cities/voupa.html

References

Populated places in Grodno Region
Nowogródek Voivodeship (1507–1795)
Grodnensky Uyezd
Białystok Voivodeship (1919–1939)
Vawkavysk District